Smythe Shoulder is an ice-covered promontory rising to about 450 m between Singer Glacier and Rydelek Icefalls, Martin Peninsula, on the Walgreen Coast, Marie Byrd Land. Mapped by United States Geological Survey (USGS) from surveys and U.S. Navy aerial photographs, 1959–67, and U.S. Landsat imagery, 1972–73. Named by Advisory Committee on Antarctic Names (US-ACAN) in 1977 after William Smythe, geophysicist, University of California, Los Angeles, a member of the United States Antarctic Research Program (USARP) winter party at South Pole Station, 1975.

Promontories of Antarctica
Landforms of Marie Byrd Land